BESM is a line of Soviet-made mainframe computers.

BESM may also refer to:

 BESm (N1, N12-bis(ethyl)spermine), a derivative of spermine
 Best estimate stress model, a method for estimating rock stress in rock mechanics
 Big Eyes, Small Mouth, a role-playing game